Cracker was a British comic book magazine printed by D. C. Thomson & Co. Ltd that ran from the issues dated 18 January 1975 to 11 September 1976 (a total of 87 issues), when it merged with The Beezer. Some material from Cracker was reprinted in Classics from the Comics.

List of Cracker comic strips
These are in alphabetical order and all numbers refer to issues of Cracker.

References

See also
List of DC Thomson Publications

Comics magazines published in the United Kingdom
Defunct British comics
DC Thomson Comics titles
British humour comics
1975 comics debuts
1976 comics endings
Magazines established in 1975
Magazines disestablished in 1976